Salaat is a 2010 art film by Kaz Rahman.

Synopsis
Five different women walk, ride and work through the day and each performs one of the five Muslim prayers Fajr (sunrise), Zohar (mid-day), Asr (afternoon), Maghrib (sunset) and Isha (evening). The film begins with 'Isha' and ends the next day at 'Maghrib' with each prayer being performed in real time amidst stunning settings. This structure also offers a glimpse at the beauty, stress and contradictions of people interacting throughout the day.

Cast
 Hédi Hurban as Zohar Lady
 Nasreen as Isha Lady
 Umran Yazici as Fajr Lady
 Sara Rahman as Asr Lady
 Zainulvara Zaheer as Maghrib Lady

Screenings
Salaat was screened at Melwood Screening Room at Pittsburgh Filmmakers and The Andy Warhol Museum in Pittsburgh, USA; Salar Jung Museum at Hyderabad and India Habitat Center at New Delhi in India and as an installation at the 4th Video Arte Festival in Camaguey, Cuba .

Reception
Faisal M. Naim wrote in The Hindu "Kaz Rehman has very beautifully depicted the bonding of mankind with its creator in his film Salaat."

References

External links
 

2010 films
Films set in Hyderabad, India
2010 drama films
Canadian drama films
2010s Canadian films